The South African Railways Class 10C 4-6-2 of 1910 was a steam locomotive from the pre-Union era in Transvaal.

In 1910, the Central South African Railways placed twelve Class 10-C  Pacific type steam locomotives in service. In 1912, these locomotives were renumbered and designated Class 10C on the South African Railways roster.

Manufacturer
In November and December 1910, twelve light  Pacific type passenger locomotives were placed in service by the Central South African Railways (CSAR). Designed by G.G. Elliot, Chief Mechanical Engineer (CME) of the CSAR, they were built along similar lines to the Class 10-2 which had been delivered to the CSAR earlier in that same year, but they were slightly smaller and had smaller coupled wheels.

They were built for the CSAR by the North British Locomotive Company (NBL) and were designated Class 10-C, numbered in the range from 1003 to 1014. As built, they used saturated steam and had Belpaire fireboxes and Walschaerts valve gear.

They embodied some of the features of their larger Class 10-2 superheated predecessors, with the notable exceptions of the feedwater heaters and superheating. They were also fitted with the Flaman speed recorder, of which the driving gear was connected to the right trailing crank pin. A new feature was the placing of the Pyle National turbo-generator unit behind the dome on top of the boiler barrel.

Tenders

Their outside-admission piston valves with straight-ported cylinders made them extraordinarily free runners and they were soon found suitable for the mainline as well. To better equip them to handle mainline passenger trains, an order for new larger Type XM2 tenders was placed with Robert Stephenson and Company. Since the original tenders were already numbered for their respective engines, the new tenders, with works numbers D1540/1 to D1540/12, were numbered N1 to N12.

In March 1922, one of these engines, no. 775 with a new Type XM2 tender, worked a special Johannesburg-Cape Town fast passenger train over the Klerksdorp-Kimberley section. This was a creditable performance for a comparatively small locomotive with only  coupled wheels and which, at the time, was not yet superheated.

Superheating
With the new larger tenders, the locomotives were therefore put to work on the Kimberley-Klerksdorp line. To enhance their performance in their new role as mainline locomotives, they were soon reboilered and equipped with superheaters, but they retained their Class 10C classification.

South African Railways
When the Union of South Africa was established on 31 May 1910, the three Colonial government railways (Cape Government Railways, Natal Government Railways and CSAR) were united under a single administration to control and administer the railways, ports and harbours of the Union. Although the South African Railways and Harbours came into existence in 1910, the actual classification and renumbering of all the rolling stock of the three constituent railways were only implemented with effect from 1 January 1912.

In 1912, these locomotives were renumbered in the range from 767 to 778 and designated Class 10C on the South African Railways (SAR).

Watson standard boilers
In the 1930s, many serving locomotives were reboilered with a standard boiler type, designed by then CME A.G. Watson as part of his standardisation policy. Such Watson Standard reboilered locomotives were reclassified by adding an "R" suffix to their classification.

All but two of the Class 10C locomotives, numbers 772 and 776, were eventually reboilered with Watson Standard no. 1 boilers and reclassified to Class 10CR.

Their original boilers were fitted with Ramsbottom safety valves, while the Watson Standard boilers were fitted with Pop safety valves. An obvious difference between an original and a Watson Standard reboilered locomotive is usually a rectangular regulator cover, just to the rear of the chimney on the reboilered locomotive. In the case of the Class 10CR locomotives, an even more obvious difference was the absence of the Belpaire firebox hump between the cab and boiler on the reboilered locomotives.

Service
When the Kimberley-Klerksdorp line was eventually relaid with heavier rails, the Class 10CR were displaced by larger and more powerful locomotives and transferred to Cape Town, where most of them worked the local inter-urban services. Part of their duties was to haul the weekly mail trains between the East Pier and Monument Station. On Fridays, the Union-Castle Line’s mailship berthed at the East Pier, from where mail trains to Transvaal and Rhodesia would depart. A shunting engine would bring these carriages from the pier via Dock Road to Monument Station, where the mainline locomotive, dining saloon, kitchen car and carriages for local passengers would be attached. They remained in this service until they were later relegated to shunting and goods pickup work for the rest of their years.

The two Class 10C locomotives went to Bloemfontein to assist with shunting. After the entire Class was withdrawn in 1973, no. 771 was sold to Lorraine gold mine in the Free State. After being retired from mine service, it was obtained by Sandstone Estates for restoration in 2011.

Works numbers
The table lists the locomotive and tender works numbers, the CSAR to SAR renumbering and the tender numbers for the Class 10C and 10CR locomotives.

Illustration
The main picture shows Watson Standard reboilered Class 10CR no. 778, with a large dome cover, passing through Woltemade No. 4 near Cape Town, c. 1930. Woltemade No. 4 no longer exists and was located between the present-day Thornton and Goodwood stations on the line from Cape Town to Bellville. The pictures illustrate the differences in the appearance of the locomotives over their lifespan.

References

External links

1670
1670
1670
4-6-2 locomotives
2′C1′ n2 locomotives
NBL locomotives
Cape gauge railway locomotives
Railway locomotives introduced in 1910
1910 in South Africa
Scrapped locomotives
2′C1′ h2 locomotives